Peoria approximella, the carmine snout moth, is a species of pyralid moth in the family Pyralidae.

The MONA or Hodges number for Peoria approximella is 6053.

References

Further reading

External links

 

Phycitinae
Moths described in 1866
Taxa named by Francis Walker (entomologist)